Maitreyi College is a women's college in the South Campus of the University of Delhi, located in Bapu Dham, Chanakyapuri, New Delhi-110021, India. It was established in July 1967 and named after the Vedic sage Maitreyi. An all-women's college, it offers various courses in the fields of Science, Arts and Commerce. The college was recognised by DBT as a star college, conferring the star status to all four of its science departments namely Botany, Zoology, Chemistry and Mathematics. In 2022, it was ranked 34th among colleges in India by National Institutional Ranking Framework. The college has been accredited grade A++ by NAAC.

Due to the construction of Pink Line, Maitreyi College is quite accessible via Delhi Metro. The nearest metro station is Durgabai Deshmukh South Campus metro station which is around 1 km from the college.

Rankings
It is ranked 34th among colleges in India by National Institutional Ranking Framework in 2022.

Academic courses and departments
Maitreyi College offers a wide range of undergraduate and graduate courses.

 Three-year undergraduate programme
 Two-year post graduate programme

Three-year Undergraduate Programmes
 Bachelor of Arts
 Bachelor with Honours in  English
 Bachelor with Honours in Hindi
 Bachelor with Honours in History
 Bachelor with Honours in Political Science
 Bachelor with Honours in Sanskrit
 Bachelor with Honours in Sociology
 Bachelor with Honours in Commerce
 Bachelor with Honours in Botany
 Bachelor with Honours in Chemistry
 Bachelor with Honours in Maths
 Bachelor with Honours in Physics
 Bachelor with Honours in Zoology
 Bachelor with Honours in Commerce
 Bachelor of Commerce
 Bachelor of Science Programme with Physical Science (Physics, Chemistry / Computer Science, Maths)
 Bachelor of Science Programme with Life Sciences (Botany Chemistry, Zoology)

Two-year Post-Graduate Programmes 

 Master of Arts in Political Science
 Master of Arts/Science in Mathematics

Awards 
Maitreyi College has won many awards for its lawns. The college was awarded 'The Deshbandhu College Cup' for the Best Lawn  and 'The Department of Persian Cup' for the Best Garden at the Delhi University Annual Flower Show 2018. The college won 17 prizes in different cut flower categories. The college's gardener, Shri Ram Bahadur was awarded the title of the Best Mali for the year 2018.

Notable alumni
 Priyanka Bose, actress and model
 Sugandha Garg, actress, singer and TV host
 Malini Agarwal, celebrity blogger, Founder & Blogger-in-Chief of MissMalini.com, radio DJ

References 

1967 establishments in Delhi
Universities and colleges in Delhi
Educational institutions established in 1967
Women's universities and colleges in Delhi